David Carcassonne (20 December 1789 – 15 November 1861 in Nîmes) was a French physician. He was born at Remoulins, a small town in the Gard department, the son of a purveyor to the army of Napoleon I. Having joined the Grande Armée as military surgeon at twenty-three years of age, he followed the emperor to Russia in 1812, and was made a prisoner there. On his return to Nîmes, where his parents had settled, Carcassonne gave up his practise and became a carpet-manufacturer. He was a member of the Municipal Council of Nîmes, under King Louis-Philippe (1837-48). Carcassonne was the author of a work entitled Essai Historique sur la Médecine des Hébreux Anciens et Modernes (Montpellier-Nîmes, 1815).

His son Léon was also a French physician and municipal councilor.

References

1789 births
1861 deaths
People from Gard
19th-century French physicians
19th-century French politicians
Napoleonic Wars prisoners of war held by Russia
French prisoners of war in the Napoleonic Wars
French military personnel of the Napoleonic Wars
French invasion of Russia
19th-century French writers